Roger Capan (May 20, 1945 – March 2, 2013) was an American speed skater. He competed in the men's 1500 metres event at the 1968 Winter Olympics.

References

1945 births
2013 deaths
American male speed skaters
Olympic speed skaters of the United States
Speed skaters at the 1968 Winter Olympics
Sportspeople from Sioux City, Iowa